Kevin David Keck (born June 20, 1973) is an American writer. His writing appears to be largely autobiographical, though in recent publications he has asserted that the character called "Kevin Keck" is in fact merely a fictional persona. He is best known for his collection of personal essays Oedipus Wrecked (Cleis Press, 2005), which chronicles his sexual coming-of-age in a humorous style that is often compared to David Sedaris and Augusten Burroughs. His writing first gained popularity when Nerve.com published a series of essays that were later collected in Oedipus Wrecked.

Much of Keck's writing oscillates between absurdist comedy that centers around altered states of consciousness and sexuality and serious reflections on religious themes. His most recent books suggest an association with Discordianism as the cover art displays many of the iconographies of Discordian beliefs, such as the Sacred Chao, and direct reference to the Greek goddess Eris.

Keck was born in Johnson City, Tennessee, and raised in Denver, North Carolina. He holds a B.A. in English literature from the University of North Carolina at Charlotte, and an M.F.A in creative writing from Syracuse University.

Trivia 
 Each of his books begins with an epigraph from Edward Abbey.
 His Cousin, Kristi Keck, was a writer for CNN.com

Bibliography 
2004 My Summer Vacation: Poems 1994 - 2004. North Carolina: M2 Press. 
2005 Oedipus Wrecked. San Francisco: Cleis Press. 
2008 Are You There God? It's Me. Kevin. New York City: Bloomsbury USA. 
2014 Hard Evidence: The Collected Bawdy Writings. North Carolina: Mitki/Mitki Press. 
2014 B-Sides: Poems 1994 - 2014. North Carolina: Mitki/Mitki Press. 
2018 Babyhead: A Novel. North Carolina: M2 Press.

Notes

External links 

 Cleis Press
 Kevin Keck (official site)
 Kevin Keck essay on writing Oedipus Wrecked

1973 births
Living people
American male poets
American essayists
American humorists
Poets from North Carolina
American male essayists
21st-century American poets
21st-century American male writers